The American Anime Awards were a series of awards designed to recognize excellence in the release of anime and manga in North America.

The first annual American Anime Awards balloting was supervised by Milton Griepp of industry website ICv2. The first gala awards presentation was hosted in New York City on February 24, 2007, at New York Comic Con. The hosts of the evening were eight actresses from the anime production company ADV Films: Christine Auten, Shelley Calene-Black, Jessica Boone, Luci Christian, Alice Fulks, Hilary Haag, Taylor Hannah and Serena Varghese. A streaming version of the one-hour awards ceremony can be seen on IGN.com. The awards were later broadcast on the Anime Network.

Voting information
The ballots contained nominations from industry companies and professionals. To be eligible for an award, anime or manga must be available in the U.S. during the previous year, prior to the awards gala. Whether by DVD (or book or periodical, in the case of manga), national TV, or theatrical release. Anime and manga are defined, as animation or comics, respectively, originally produced in Japan.

Voting was conducted via an online ballot system. The American Anime Awards partnered with respected industry news site ICv2 to host and track the fan voting to ensure accurate voting and to eliminate any mass voting by single individuals. Fans cast their votes at www.americananimeawards.com starting on January 1, 2007, and ending on January 31, 2007.

Award nominees
Winners are denoted in bold

Best Anime Feature
Akira
Final Fantasy VII Advent Children
Fullmetal Alchemist: Conqueror of Shamballa
InuYasha Movie 4: Fire on Mystic Island
Pokémon: Lucario and the Mystery of Mew

Best Comedy Anime
Ah! My Goddess
FLCL
Kodocha
Ranma ½
Tenchi Muyo Ryo-Ohki

Best Long Series
Naruto
InuYasha
Rurouni Kenshin
Fullmetal Alchemist
Samurai Champloo

Best Short Series
Elfen Lied
FLCL
Gravitation TV
Hellsing Ultimate
Ranma ½ OAV

Best Manga
Bleach
Neon Genesis Evangelion
Death Note
Naruto
Fruits Basket

Best Actor
Johnny Yong Bosch (Akira, Bleach, Eureka Seven)
Crispin Freeman (Hellsing Ultimate, Noein, Revolutionary Girl Utena)
Richard Hayworth (Rurouni Kenshin)
Yuri Lowenthal (Naruto)
Vic Mignogna (Fullmetal Alchemist, Macross)

Best Actress
Luci Christian (Princess Tutu)
Susan Dalian (Naruto)
Maile Flanagan (Naruto)Mary Elizabeth McGlynn (Ghost in the Shell: Stand Alone Complex 2nd GIG)Michelle Ruff (Bleach, Lupin the Third)

Best Actor in a Comedy
Greg Ayres (Negima, Nerima Daikon Brothers)
Johnny Yong Bosch (Akira)
Liam O'Brien (Comic Party, DNA Squared, Girls Bravo)
Tony Oliver (Lupin III)Dave Wittenberg (Zatch Bell)Best Actress in a Comedy
Laura Bailey (Kodocha)
Luci Christian (Desert Punk, Negima, Nerima Daikon Brothers)Debi Derryberry (Zatch Bell)Hilary Haag (Paniponi Dash)
Michelle Ruff (Lupin the 3rd)

Best Cast
FLCLFullmetal AlchemistGhost in the Shell: Stand Alone Complex 2nd GIG
Inuyasha
Naruto

Best DVD Package Design
Bleach Volume 1
Final Fantasy VII Advent ChildrenFullmetal AlchemistHellsing Ultimate Volume 1: Limited Edition
Naruto Uncut Box Set 1

Best Anime Theme Song
"*: Asterisk" by Orange Range, Bleach
"Heart of Sword--Yoake Mae" by T.M. Revolution, Rurouni Kenshin"Rewrite" by Asian Kung-Fu Generation, Fullmetal Alchemist'"Ride on Shooting Star" by The Pillows, FLCL"Rise" by Origa, Ghost in the Shell: Stand Alone Complex 2nd GigSpecial Award for Outstanding Achievement
 Awarded to Peter Fernandez

Criticism
The nominating and voting process has received criticism from fans for lack of clarity and being too inclusive: for example, while some acting nominees are specifically cited for one or more series, others are cited for none at all, leaving it to the voter to decide if they should consider the series specifically mentioned, or the actor's entire body of work. Also, since evidently any anime that was released in any way in 2006 is eligible for nomination, some actors have been nominated for work done years or even decades ago. Another criticism was the apparent error of including Johnny Yong Bosch as Best Actor in a Comedy despite the fact Akira'' is not a comedy.

Coverage 
The news of the awards were announced on major websites on affiliated websites like ICv2, but was also reported and followed like IGN.

See also

 List of animation awards
 List of manga awards

References

External links
Interview: Milton Griepp and the American Anime Awards at Anime News Network

Anime industry
Anime awards
Awards established in 2007
2007 establishments in the United States
American animation awards
Manga awards